Sakunothayan Botanical Garden is an botanical garden in Wang Thong District, Phitsanulok Province, northern Thailand.  The park, at kilometer 33 of Phitsanulok-Lomsak Road, has 164 species of plants.

History
Royal Forest Department has changed its name to "Sakunothayan Forst Park" in 1958 and to "Sakunothayan Arboretum" in 1961.
On 4 February 2018 Department of National Parks, Wildlife and Plant Conservation upgraded it to "Sakunothayan Botanical Garden".

Wang Nok Aen Waterfall
Wang Nok Aen or Sakunothayan Waterfall, within the arboretum, is a  elevation drop of the Wang Thong River.

References

External links
Office of the Forest Herbarium, National Park, Wildlife and Plant Conservation Department

Geography of Phitsanulok province
Wang Nok Aen
Botanical gardens in Thailand
Tourist attractions in Phitsanulok province